Shirley Scheier (born 1953 Jackson County, Missouri) is an American painter and printmaker. She studied at the University of Kansas and the University of Wisconsin–Madison. She was the recipient of a MacDowell fellowship in 1994. She taught at the University of Washington from 1986 to 2016.

Examples of her work are included in the collections of the Seattle Art Museum, the Portland Art Museum the Tacoma Art Museum and the Nelson-Atkins Museum of Art.

References

External links
Artist's website

1953 births
Living people
20th-century American women artists
21st-century American women artists
American printmakers
American women printmakers